Mendel Kaplan may refer to:

Yisrael Mendel Kaplan (1913–1985), rabbi and teacher
Mendel Kaplan (philanthropist) (1936–2009), South African Jewish industrialist, philanthropist and community activist